Novodugino is a rural locality (a selo) and the administrative center of Novoduginsky District, Smolensk Oblast, Russia. Population:

Climate
Novodugino has a warm-summer humid continental climate (Dfb in the Köppen climate classification).

<div style="width:70%;">

References

Notes

Sources

Rural localities in Smolensk Oblast
Sychyovsky Uyezd